Chrysopilus asiliformis, the 'little snipefly', is a species of 'snipe flies' (family Rhagionidae).

Subspecies
Subspecies include:
Chrysopilus asiliformis var. asiliformis  (Preyssler, 1791)  
Chrysopilus asiliformis  var. meridiomalis Bezzi, 1898

Distribution
This widespread species is present in most of Europe.

Habitat
This species inhabits various environments, as scrubs, woodland edges, wetlands and gardens.

Description
This fragile-looking fly shows a slender body. Head, thorax and abdomen are grey dusted, with dark stripes on the abdomen, without bristles The legs are rather long and thin, with brownish-yellow femora. The wings are hyaline with a dark well marked pterostigma. Eyes are greenish.

Biology
Adults can be encountered from May through September. The larvae probably develop in soil.

Bibliography
 Watson, L., and Dallwitz, M.J. 2003 onwards. British insects: the families of Diptera. Version: 16 December 2010

References

External links
 
 
 Zoographia Germaniae
 Flies, gnats

Rhagionidae
Insects described in 1791
Taxa named by Jan Daniel Preysler
Diptera of Europe